V/H/S is a 2012 American found footage horror anthology film and the first installment in the V/H/S franchise created by Brad Miska and Bloody Disgusting and produced by Miska and Roxanne Benjamin. It features a series of found footage shorts written and directed by Adam Wingard, David Bruckner, Ti West, Glenn McQuaid, Joe Swanberg, and the filmmaking collective Radio Silence.

The film debuted at the 2012 Sundance Film Festival in January 2012, and was released on demand on August 31, 2012. The film made its limited theatrical premiere in the United States on October 5, 2012, and in the United Kingdom on January 18, 2013.

The film spawned five sequels, V/H/S/2, V/H/S: Viral, V/H/S/94, V/H/S/99, V/H/S/85 and two spin-offs, Siren and Kids vs. Aliens, as well as a miniseries V/H/S: Video Horror Shorts on Snapchat's Snap Originals platform.

Genesis 
In an interview with IndieWire, producer Brad Miska revealed the process in which they developed V/H/S, which included a "trust-fall" style of filmmaking.  All of the relationships came through the long history of Bloody Disgusting.

Plot
The film is presented as an anthology of short horror films, built into a frame narrative which acts as its own short horror film. Each short film is linked together with the concept of found footage (each segment is from the VHS tapes found in the room).

"Tape 56"/frame narrative (Prologue)
Directed by Adam Wingard
Written by Adam Wingard and Simon Barrett
The frame narrative focuses on a criminal gang who film their exploits, which include smashing the walls, windows, and light fixtures of an abandoned house and sexually assaulting a woman in a parking lot. An anonymous source offers them a large sum of money to break into a house and steal a single VHS videotape. The gang accept the task, eager to expand their criminal enterprises.

Entering the house, the criminals find the corpse of an old man sitting in front of several televisions playing white noise. While the other criminals are free to roam the house, Brad stays behind in the TV room with the dead body to watch a tape left in the VCR.

"Amateur Night"

Directed by David Bruckner
Written by David Bruckner and Nicholas Tecosky

Shane, Patrick, and Clint are three friends who have rented a motel room to fulfill Shane's intent of bringing women back for sex. Clint is wearing glasses that have been outfitted with a hidden camera and microphone that will allow them to turn their planned encounter into an amateur porn video. While the three men are bar-hopping, Clint encounters Lily, a mysterious young woman who appears unusually shy and says little other than "I like you."

In addition to picking up Lily, the men also succeed in convincing another young woman, Lisa, to return to their motel room. Lisa passes out as Shane attempts to initiate sex while Patrick discourages him from continuing. Lily continues awkwardly coming on to Clint, but it is Shane who comes on to her instead. Clint notices that Lily's feet are clawed and have scales as he undresses her, but Shane and Patrick are oblivious. Lily appears responsive, pushing Shane onto his back and then beginning to undress Clint, seemingly beginning a threesome. Overwhelmed, Clint goes to the bathroom. Patrick disrobes and attempts to take Clint's place, but Lily has made it clear that she dislikes Patrick.

Moments later, Patrick bursts into the bathroom with a large cut on his hand, claiming that Lily bit him. When they approach Shane, Lily suddenly sprouts fangs, then attacks and kills Shane. Clint and Patrick hide in the bathroom until Patrick, still nude, arms himself with a shower curtain rod and returns to the room. Clint tries to wake Lisa as Patrick attempts to fight Lily, but she subdues and pounces on him, drinking his blood and ripping off his genitals. Clint escapes the room, but ends up falling down a stairwell, breaking his wrist in the process. Lily catches up to Clint, her face hideously contorted, but instead of attacking, she attempts to perform fellatio. As Clint is unresponsive, Lily believes he has rejected her, starts to cry, and then begins growling angrily. Clint flees, begging bystanders for help, but he is suddenly lifted into the sky by Lily, who has transformed into a winged creature. It is revealed Lily was actually a succubus on the hunt for a mate. The glasses fall off Clint's face as Lily carries him away, hitting the ground before the footage ends.

"Tape 56" (Interlude 1)

Back in the frame story, one of the criminals discovers that Brad, the person who stayed to watch the tape, is missing. Meanwhile, the other criminals search the basement and discover hundreds of unmarked VHS tapes, and begin collecting them all to ensure they get the right one. One of them manages to catch a glimpse of a strange figure wandering off when they gather the tapes. The criminal still upstairs, Rox, replaces the tape in the VCR with a different one and settles down to watch it.

"Second Honeymoon"
Directed by Ti West
Written by Ti West
Sam and Stephanie are a married couple travelling to Arizona for their honeymoon, with Stephanie recording and documenting everything along the way. That night, they visit a Wild West-themed attraction known as "Wild West Junction", where Stephanie receives a prediction from a mechanical fortune teller dressed as a prospector. The prediction claims that she will soon be happily reunited with a loved one, and that she is also very trusting and is easily taken advantage of. Sometime later, a strange woman comes to Sam and Stephanie's motel room and awkwardly tries to convince Sam (off camera) to give her a ride somewhere the next day.

In the middle of the night, while the couple are asleep, a mysterious stranger breaks into the room, turns on the camcorder, and films themselves stroking Stephanie's buttocks with a switchblade. The intruder also steals $100 from Sam's wallet and dips his toothbrush in the toilet. The next day, on their way to visit the Grand Canyon, Sam notices the missing money and accuses Stephanie of taking it, but she assures him that she did not. That night, the stranger enters the room again and repeatedly stabs Sam in the neck with the switchblade, filming him as he chokes to death on his own blood. The camera then shows the killer, the woman from earlier wearing a porcelain mask, cleaning the blade while she and Stephanie make out passionately, revealing that the woman was Stephanie's lover. The recording cuts to Stephanie and her lover driving away, with Stephanie asking her lover if she has erased the footage.

"Tape 56" (Interlude 2)

Back in the frame story, Rox is left confused by what he has witnessed. Unknown to him however, the old man's corpse has disappeared. Back in the basement, the other criminals debate on why the tape they are after is so special, and also plan to make copies of it so they can make extra money. The film then transitions to the next tape.

"Tuesday the 17th"
Directed by Glenn McQuaid
Written by Glenn McQuaid
A group of 20-somethings, Joey, Spider, and Samantha, accompany their new friend, Wendy, on her annual trip to a lake located in a nearby forest. Joey films the group as Wendy leads them through the woods, occasionally mentioning "accidents" that took the lives of her friends. When the camera scans certain areas, glitched images of mutilated bodies appear in the film. They also discover the mutilated corpse of a pig nearby, shortly before Wendy mentions that everyone is going to die. Relaxing and smoking weed by the lake, Wendy tells the others that the lake is the same place where a murderer killed many people years earlier, but the group laughs it off as a joke.

Spider and Samantha leave the group for a bathroom break. Suddenly, Samantha is killed when a knife is launched into her face. Spider attempts to run, but is stabbed in the head repeatedly by the culprit: a strange figure with a featureless red head obscured in tracking errors known as "The Glitch" (identified as such in the end credits). Back at the lake, Joey asks Wendy where Spider and Samantha went, to which she answers that they left, then awkwardly asks if he wants to have sex. Joey guesses that Wendy was serious about the story she had been telling them about the murders, mentioning that he remembers hearing about it himself. Dropping the façade, Wendy reveals that she had been to the lake before, where the murderer slaughtered all of her friends, leaving her as the only survivor. She notes that the police did not believe her when she said that the killer could be in two places at once. Wendy then tells Joey that she lured all three of them to the woods to use as bait, so that she can find and kill the Glitch. As the two talk, the Glitch walks up behind Joey and slits his throat.

Wendy runs away, luring the Glitch into a pit trap, then into a bear trap, which traps it momentarily. She tries filming the Glitch up close, but it continues to be obscured by the tracking errors and slashes her hand. Wendy continues to run through the woods, warning anyone who finds the tape never to come to the area. She finds Joey in his death throes and watches as he dies. The Glitch approaches Wendy before a bed of spikes impales it. Wendy gloats at the Glitch and walks away, but when she turns around, it is gone. It reappears in a tree and pounces on Wendy, beating her to death with the camera, then slashes her stomach, subsequently eviscerating her. Wendy's corpse is last seen twitching and shuddering violently as the camera glitches out, revealing that she is becoming a Glitch herself.

"Tape 56" (Interlude 3)

Back in the frame story, the old man's body has returned to the room, but Rox is nowhere to be seen. The remaining criminals, Zak and Gary, are confused as to where the others have gone, with Gary telling Zak to look through the tapes. Zak replaces the current tape with a new one and sits down to watch.

"The Sick Thing That Happened to Emily When She Was Younger"
 Directed by Joe Swanberg
 Written by Simon Barrett
Told entirely through a series of computer video chats, Emily tells her boyfriend James, an aspiring doctor, about a strange bump on her arm and how it reminds her of an accident she had when she was younger. After showing James around her apartment, Emily hears noises outside her door. After investigating the room, Emily witnesses a small, ghostly, childlike entity rush into her room and slam the door shut, leading her to believe that her apartment is haunted.  Hearing the noises again the next night, Emily attempts to investigate some more, only to discover the entity again when she turns on the light. She questions her landlord about the disturbances, but the landlord claims that no children have ever lived in the apartment complex, nor have any people ever died there, but Emily is unconvinced. During her next video chat with James, Emily nonchalantly digs into the bump on her arm with a scalpel and a meat fork to find out what exactly the bump is, but James urges her to stop before the wound becomes infected, promising to check on it himself when he arrives in a week.

The next night, Emily attempts to contact the strange child. She closes her eyes and carries her laptop to have James look out for the being. The ghostly child appears again along with a similarly ghostly young girl. The children manage to knock her unconscious as James quickly appears in her apartment. The children are revealed to not be ghosts, but rather aliens, watching as James surgically removes an alien fetus from Emily's torso, revealing that they are using Emily as an incubator for alien/human hybrids. James, who has been working with the aliens and removing the fetuses for some time, questions the aliens how much longer they plan to do this to Emily as he worries that she may not survive much more of it, mentioning to them that the arm bump is a tracking device. The aliens erase Emily's memory, while James breaks some of her bones to "make it look like an accident again".

In their next chat, a badly injured Emily believes that she sustained her injuries after wandering into traffic in a fugue state. She reveals that the doctor James recommended has diagnosed her as schizoaffective, and tearfully says that James deserves a better, more normal girlfriend. James assures Emily that she is the only person he wants to be with, but once their chat ends, he begins a new chat with a different woman. This woman has the same bump on her arm and also believes that James is her boyfriend, revealing that the aliens are using multiple people as incubators.

"Tape 56" (Epilogue) 

Back in the frame story, both Zak and the old man's corpse are gone. Gary, now the only one left, searches the rooms upstairs. He finds the decapitated remains of Zak and is subsequently attacked by the old man, who has become a zombie. Gary attempts to flee downstairs, but he falls and twists his ankle, and is killed by the zombie. The frame story ends with the camera left in the TV room picking up the sound of the VCR starting the last tape by itself.

"10/31/98"
Directed by Radio Silence
Written by Radio Silence
On Halloween night 1998, Tyler, dressed as a teddy bear implanted with a nanny cam, meets his friends, Chad, Matt, and Paul (dressed as the Unabomber, a pirate, and a Marine, respectively) as they head out to a Halloween party at a friend's house, only to end up at the wrong place. Thinking that they are the first ones to arrive, the quartet sneak inside. They begin to experience paranormal phenomena, but believe that they are at a realistic haunted house attraction and have fun with it.

In the attic, they find several men gathered around a young woman whom they have suspended from the rafters, apparently performing an exorcism. The men happen to be chanting "cast you down" towards the woman, and the boys exuberantly join in. This alerts the men to their presence, and they react angrily to them before proceeding to physically assault the young woman, causing some of the men to be pulled upwards into the darkness by an unseen force. More violent, overtly threatening paranormal phenomena then begin to occur as the boys initially flee, but realize that they should try to rescue the girl. Returning to the attic, the boys work to untie her and get her to safety. When the girl is freed, the house comes to life with poltergeist phenomena, with ghostly arms rising from the walls and the floors to claim the lives of the woman's captors.

Exiting through the basement, the boys pile into their car with the girl and drive away. The car abruptly stops and the girl disappears, reappearing in the street before them and walking away amid a flock of birds. The boys then realize that the car has stopped on train tracks. The boys attempt to get out of the car as a train approaches, but they are unable to start the car or unlock the doors. The train smashes into the car off-camera, killing all inside.

During the end credits, clips from Tape 56 are shown.

Alternative ending to "10/31/98"
A joke ending was shot in one take by Radio Silence, in which the doors are unlocked and the boys get out just before the train smashes into their car. The boys walk away and talk about how much fun they had, and what a crazy night it was. Meanwhile, the train hits the car and it explodes behind them.

Cast

"Tape 56"
 Calvin Reeder as Gary
 Lane Hughes as Zak
 Kentucker Audley as Rox
 Adam Wingard as Brad
 Frank Stack as Old Man
 Sarah Byrne as Abbey
 Melissa Boatright as Tabitha
 Simon Barrett as Steve
 Andrew Droz Palermo as Fifth Thug

"Amateur Night"
 Hannah Fierman as Lily
 Mike Donlan as Shane
 Joe Sykes as Patrick
 Drew Sawyer as Clint
 Jasper Lewis as Lisa

"Second Honeymoon"
 Joe Swanberg as Sam
 Sophia Takal as Stephanie
 Kate Lyn Sheil as Girl

"Tuesday the 17th"
 Norma C. Quinones as Wendy
 Drew Moerlein as Joey Brenner
 Jeannine Yoder as Samantha
 Jason Yachanin as Spider
 Bryce Burke as The Glitch

"The Sick Thing That Happened to Emily When She Was Younger"
 Helen Rogers as Emily
 Daniel Kaufman as James
 Liz Harvey as The New Girl
 Corrie Fitzpatrick as Girl Alien
 Isaiah Hillman as Boy Alien
 Taliyah Hillman as Little Girl Alien

"10/31/98"
 Chad Villella as Chad
 Matt Bettinelli-Olpin as Matt
 Tyler Gillett as Tyler
 Paul Natonek as Paul
 Nicole Erb as The Girl
 John Walcutt as Cult Leader
 Eric Curtis as Roommate

Release
Trevor Groth, a programmer of midnight movies at the Sundance Film Festival, said, "I give this all the credit in the world because conceptually it shouldn't have worked for me. Personally, I'm bored by found-footage horror films, which this is. And omnibus attempts rarely work. But this one does. It's terrifying, and very well executed." Horror-Movies.ca reported that two people fainted during the premiere at Sundance.

At the 2012 Sundance Film Festival, Magnolia Pictures purchased the North American rights to the film for slightly over $1 million. The first theatrical release began in Russia September 7, 2012. Limited theatrical release began October 5, 2012, in the United States. The film was released onto DVD, Blu-ray, and digital download on December 4, 2012. It was released on the titular format of VHS on February 5, 2013.

Reception
The film holds a 56% approval rating on Rotten Tomatoes, based on 106 reviews, with an average rating of 5.60/10. The website's critical consensus reads, "An uneven collection of found-footage horror films, V/H/S has some inventive scares but its execution is hit-and-miss." Metacritic, which assigns a weighted mean rating out of 100 to reviews from mainstream critics, the film holds an average score of 54, based on reviews from 22 critics, indicating "mixed or average reviews".

Most reviewers said that they felt the film was too long. Variety noted that "the segments vary in quality and the whole overstays its welcome at nearly two hours. Some trimming (perhaps relegating a weaker episode to a DVD extra) would increase theatrical chances."

Empire gave the film four stars out of five, saying that "the biggest twist is its consistently high quality ... anything goes, and all of it works". The Hollywood Reporter gave the film a mildly positive review, stating "Refreshingly, V/H/S promises no more than it delivers, always a plus with genre fare." Fangoria praised the film while remarking that "the mystery of why/how some of this stuff is even on VHS tapes to begin with" was a bit of a leap.

Sean O'Connell of The Washington Post gave the film a scathing review, saying that although "on paper, it's a clever concept" and "probably sounded great in the pitch meeting", it "loses all luster through some shoddy execution". He went on to criticise the "unwatchable shaky-cam technique" and "rough and amateurish" acting, though he did identify Swanberg's segment as the best. Likewise, Roger Ebert was among the critics who felt the film was overlong, giving the film one star out of four and saying that "None of the segments is particularly compelling. Strung together, it's way too much of a muchness."

Sequels and spin-offs
A sequel, titled V/H/S/2, was debuted at January 19 as part of Sundance 2013. The film was released via VOD on June 6, and theatrically on July 12. A third entry in the series, titled V/H/S: Viral, was released on Video on Demand on October 23, 2014, and in theatres on November 21 of the same year.

A spin-off based on the segment Amateur Night, entitled Siren released theatrically on December 2, 2016.

A 4-episode miniseries V/H/S: Video Horror Shorts was released on Snap Originals on October 28, 2018.

A reboot titled V/H/S/94 was released exclusively on Shudder on October 6, 2021.

The sequel V/H/S/99 debuted in the Midnight Madness stream at the 2022 Toronto International Film Festival and was released on Shudder October 20, 2022.

A second spin-off film Kids vs. Aliens, a feature-length adaptation of "Slumber Party Alien Abduction", from Jason Eisener's segment from V/H/S/2 premiered at Fantastic Fest in 2022 and released in January 20, 2023 by RLJE Films and Shudder.

V/H/S/85 is scheduled to be released on Shudder in 2023.

References

External links
 
 
 
 
 
 

2012 films
2012 horror films
2012 independent films
2012 LGBT-related films
2010s gang films
2010s ghost films
2010s monster movies
2010s supernatural horror films
American ghost films
American haunted house films
American independent films
American monster movies
American science fiction horror films
American supernatural horror films
American zombie films
Demons in film
Films about altered memories
Films about exorcism
Films about extraterrestrial life
Films about pornography
Films about railway accidents and incidents
Films about schizophrenia
Films directed by Adam Wingard
Films directed by David Bruckner
Films directed by Ti West
Films set in 1998
Films set in Arizona
Films set in forests
Films shot in Columbia, Missouri
Films directed by Matt Bettinelli-Olpin & Tyler Gillett
Films with screenplays by Matt Bettinelli-Olpin & Tyler Gillett
Films set in motels
Films with screenplays by David Bruckner
Found footage films
Halloween horror films
Home invasions in film
Lesbian-related films
American horror anthology films
Films about self-harm
Succubi in film
Films with screenplays by Simon Barrett (filmmaker)
Films produced by Simon Barrett (filmmaker)
Films about snuff films
Screenlife films
2010s English-language films
2010s American films
V/H/S (franchise)